Thomas Albert Parker (22 November 1906 – 11 November 1964) was an English footballer. His regular position was at centre-half. He was born in Eccles, Lancashire. He played for Manchester United, Bristol City, Carlisle United and Stalybridge Celtic.

External links
Profile at StretfordEnd.co.uk
Profile at MUFCInfo.com

1906 births
1964 deaths
People from Eccles, Greater Manchester
English footballers
Association football midfielders
Manchester United F.C. players
Bristol City F.C. players
Carlisle United F.C. players
Stalybridge Celtic F.C. players